SIB-1757 is a drug used in scientific research which was one of the first compounds developed that acts as a selective  antagonist for the metabotropic glutamate receptor subtype mGluR5. It has anti-hyperalgesia effects in animals. SIB-1757 along with other mGluR5 antagonists has been shown to have neuroprotective and hepatoprotective effects, and it is also used to study the role of the mGluR5 receptor in brain development.

References

Pyridines
Azo compounds
MGlu5 receptor antagonists